The ark of bulrushes was a container which, according to the episode known as the finding of Moses in the biblical Book of Exodus, carried the infant Moses.

The ark, containing the three-month-old baby Moses, was placed in reeds by the river bank (presumably the Nile) to protect him from the Egyptian mandate to drown every male Hebrew child, and discovered there by Pharaoh's daughter.

Analysis
The ark is described as being daubed with asphalt and pitch, and the English word "ark" is a translation of the Hebrew תֵּבָה (tevah, modern teiva), the same word used for Noah's Ark. According to Irving Finkel, the word tevah is nearly identical to the Babylonian word for an oblong boat (ṭubbû), especially given that "v" and "b" are the same letter in Hebrew: bet (ב).

The "bulrushes" ( gome) were likely to have been papyrus stalks (Cyperus papyrus), daubed with bitumen and pitch (which probably refers to the sticky mud of the Nile).

A similar but earlier story is told of Sargon of Akkad.

See also
 Reed boat

References

Reed boats
Moses
Book of Exodus
Hebrew Bible objects
Egypt in the Hebrew Bible

Bibliography